Pedro Gutiérrez de Valdivia or Valdiva (April 17, 1497 – December 25, 1553) was a Spanish conquistador and the first royal governor of Chile. After serving with the Spanish army in Italy and Flanders, he was sent to South America in 1534, where he served as lieutenant under Francisco Pizarro in Peru, acting as his second in command.

In 1540 he led an expedition of 150 Spaniards into Chile, where he defeated a large force of indigenous warriors and founded Santiago in 1541. He extended Spanish rule south to the Biobío River in 1546, fought again in Peru (1546 – 48), and returned to Chile as governor in 1549. He began to conquer Chile south of the Biobío and founded Concepción in 1550. He was captured and killed in a campaign against the Mapuche. The city of Valdivia in Chile is named after him.

Early life as soldier in Europe and arrival in the Americas
Pedro de Valdivia is believed to have been born in Villanueva de la Serena 
(some say Castuera) in Extremadura, Spain around 1500 (some sources put his date of birth as early as 1497 or as late as 1505) to an impoverished hidalgo family. In 1520 a civil war broke out in Castile, the Revolt of the Comuneros, and Valdivia joined the army of Spanish king Charles I. He later fought in Flanders in 1521 and Italy between 1522 and 1527, participating in the battle of Pavia as part of the troops of the Marquis of Pescara. In May 1527, Valdivia was involved in the sack of Rome as a member of Charles I's mutinous mercenary army.

He traveled with Spanish forces to South America in 1535. He was assigned for a year to present-day Venezuela. He was moved to Peru in 1537.

There he took part on the side of Hernando Pizarro in his struggle against Diego de Almagro and fought in the battle of Las Salinas in 1538; Almagro was defeated and captured.  Afterwards Valdivia accompanied Hernando and Gonzalo Pizarro to conquer both the province of Collao and las Charcas in High Peru (currently Bolivia). As compensation for his help in conquering these lands, he was awarded a silver mine and became a wealthy man.

Valdivia had married Marina Ortíz de Gaete in Spain. In Peru he became attached to Inés de Suárez, a widow who accompanied him to Chile as his mistress.

Expedition to Chile

After the failure of the expedition of Diego de Almagro in 1536, the lands to the south of Peru (then known as Nueva Toledo, extending from the 14° — close to modern day Pisco, Peru — to the 25° latitude — close to Taltal, Chile) had remained unexplored. Valdivia asked governor Francisco Pizarro for permission to complete the conquest of that territory. He got his permission but was appointed as Lieutenant Governor, rather than Governor as he had wanted.

The expedition was fraught with problems from the beginning. Valdivia had to sell the lands and the mine that had been assigned to him in order to finance the expedition. A shortage of soldiers and adventurers was also problematic; the men were not interested in conquering what they believed were extremely poor lands. While Valdivia was preparing the expedition, Pedro Sánchez de la Hoz arrived from Spain with a royal grant for the same territory. To avoid difficulties, Pizarro advised the two competitors to join their interests, and on December 28, 1539, they signed a contract of partnership.

The small expedition finally left Cuzco, Peru in January 1540, with Pizarro's permission and Pedro Sancho de Hoz as partner. They carried a plethora of seeds for planting, a drove of swine and brood mares, and almost a thousand native warriors, but few Spaniards. Only one woman was among the travelers, Inés de Suárez, Valdivia's mistress. En route more Spaniards joined the expedition, attracted by Valdivia's fame as a brilliant leader. These conquistadores had formed part of the failed campaigns to the highlands of Bolivia; together around 150 Spaniards joined the expedition.

Valdivia resolved to avoid the road over the Andes, which had proved fatal to Almagro's army, and set out resolutely through the Atacama Desert. On the way, Sancho de Hoz, seeking sole leadership, tried to murder Valdivia but failed. He was pardoned, but from then on had to accept subordinate status. The natives of the region were not pleased by the return of the Spaniards due to the maltreatment they had suffered under Almagro. With many promises, Valdivia was able to regain their trust. After a march of five months, and suffering great privations, the expedition arrived at the Copiapo valley. Valdivia officially took possession of the land in the name of the Spanish king.

Soon thereafter they continued south and in December 1540, eleven months after they left Cuzco, Valdivia and his expedition reached the valley of the Mapocho river, where they established the capital of the territory. The valley was extensive and well populated with natives. Its soil was fertile and there was abundant fresh water. Two high hills provided defensive positions. Soon after their arrival, Valdivia tried to convince the native inhabitants of his good intentions, sending out delegations bearing gifts for the caciques.

Finally on February 12, 1541, Valdivia officially founded the city of Santiago de la Nueva Extremadura (named after Saint James, Santiago in Spanish, and Valdivia's home region of Extremadura, Spain). The ceremony was held at the foot of the Huelén hill (now known as Santa Lucia hill).

After arriving in Chile, Valdivia and his men worked to restore a positive relationship between the conquistadores and Indians, which had been greatly harmed by Almagro and his merciless ways. At first, Valdivia was successful in his efforts, but this peaceful coexistence did not last long. One of the first orders that Valdivia gave was to have a ship constructed at the mouth of the Aconcagua River to send to Peru for further supplies and to serve as a courier service. He then had to return in haste to Santiago to subdue a mutiny. The Spaniards' greed surfaced and overshadowed previous intentions when rumors of gold arose at the Marga Marga mines, in the vicinity of Valparaiso. The settlers began forcing the natives to work there.

Colonization of Chile

On learning of Francisco Pizarro's murder in 1541, Valdivia had himself appointed governor of the territory by the council of the new city, and removed Chile from Peruvian control, acknowledging only the royal authority, an arrangement the Crown found acceptable. Secure now in his own domain, he pushed exploration southward and aided the development of the country by dividing the land among his ablest followers and parceling out the Indians in encomiendas. Chile possessed minerals, but Valdivia definitely subordinated mining to agriculture and stock raising. Still, the colony was not prosperous; gold was scarce and the Araucanians warlike.

Destruction of Santiago
After an apparent peaceful period the Natives began to resist the invaders. Valdivia marched against the tribes and defeated them at Cachapoal. While away, on September 11, 1541, local people led by Michimalonco attacked Santiago. The defense of the city was led by Pedro's mistress Inés de Suárez. The Spaniards, desperate and willing to fight until death, were able to eventually push the Natives back; Valdivia and his troops made it back just in time to relieve the capital.

By the time the battle ended the entire town had been destroyed and burned to the ground, animals were killed and the fields and stores were decimated. Only a small amount of property was not destroyed, including a handful of seeds, two sows, one pig and a pair of chickens. Valdivia organized his men into groups to keep watch over the crops and protect the city against attack. For the next two years, there were men always saddled and armed, ready to fight in case the Natives posed a threat to Spanish authority.

This event meant a real setback for the conquest of the Chilean territory. The resistance of the Native people became stronger daily, and as the ship that he had constructed in Aconcagua was also destroyed by the natives, Valdivia sent in 1542 overland to Peru his lieutenant Alonso de Monroy with five followers to seek reinforcements, but, on account of the disturbance in that country in consequence of the defeat of El Mozo Almagro by Cristóbal Vaca de Castro, Monroy could not obtain much aid, and returned in September 1543, with only seventy horsemen, also sending by sea a vessel with provisions and ammunition to the port of Aconcagua.

Expanding the colony

In September 1543 new arms, clothes and other equipment arrived from Peru on the ship Santiaguillo; thanks to these new supplies, Valdivia was in the position to start the rebuilding of Santiago and to send an expedition, led by Juan Bohón, to explore and populate the northern region of Chile. This expedition founded La Serena halfway between Santiago and the northern Atacama Desert, in the valley of Coquimbo. Valparaíso, though used as a port by the Spaniards from the start, had no considerable population until much later.

In 1544 Valdivia sent a naval expedition consisting of the barks San Pedro and Santiaguillo, under the command of Juan Bautista Pastene, to reconnoiter the southwestern coast of South America, ordering him to reach the Strait of Magellan. The expedition set sail from Valparaíso and although Pastene did not reach this goal, he explored much of the coast. He entered the  bay of San Pedro, and made landings at what are now known as Concepción and at Valdivia, which was later named in honor of the commander. Encountering severe storms further south, he then returned to Valparaiso.

In February 1546 Valdivia himself set out, with sixty horsemen plus native guides and porters, and crossed the Itata River. He got to the Bío-Bío River where he planned to found another town. However, the party was attacked by Mapuche warriors at the Battle of Quilacura. Realizing that it would be impossible to proceed in such hostile territory with so limited a force, Valdivia wisely elected to return to Santiago shortly thereafter, after finding a site for a new city at what is now Penco and would become the first site of Concepción. Still, Valdivia managed to subdue the country between Santiago and the Maule River.

Return to Peru

To secure additional aid and confirm his claims to the conquered territory, Valdivia returned in 1547 to Peru, leaving Francisco de Villagra as governor in his stead. There he tried to gather more resources and men to continue the conquest. When the Gonzalo Pizarro rebellion began in Peru, the insurgents attempted unsuccessfully to win Valdivia to their side. Nonetheless, early in 1548 Valdivia joined the royal army of Viceroy Pedro de la Gasca, and his military experience counted heavily in the victory of Xaquixahuana on April 9 of that year. In the battle, Valdivia met Francisco de Carvajal, who just like him had also fought in the Italian Wars, been at the Sack of Rome and helped to defeat Diego de Almagro.

Nonetheless, a discontented faction from Chile managed to have him tried in Lima, accused of tyranny, malfeasance of public funds and public immorality. One of the charges levelled against him was that he, being married, openly lived with Inés de Suárez "...in the manner of man and wife and they sleep in one bed and they eat in one dish...". In exchange for being freed, and for his confirmation as Royal Governor, he agreed to relinquish her and to bring to Chile his wife, Marina Ortíz de Gaete, who only arrived after Valdivia's death in 1554. He was also ordered to marry Inés off, which he did, upon his return to Chile in 1549, to one of his captains, Rodrigo de Quiroga. As recognition for his services Valdivia was finally appointed as adelantado and won the royal assent to his coveted title of Governor of Chile, returning to the settlement with his position and prestige considerably strengthened.

Arauco War

Between 1549 and 1553, after his arrival back in Santiago, Valdivia again undertook the conquest of southern Chile, but faced heavy resistance from the indigenous population. Valdivia had a clash with the warlike Araucanians beyond the Bio-Bio River in 1550 in which he defeated them but by no means broke their will to resist, a will that grew stronger when the conquistador established settlements in their territory. In spite of the fierce resistance at the Battle of Penco, he founded Concepción on March 3, 1550. Later he founded the more southern villages of La Imperial, Valdivia, Angol and Villarrica, in 1551 and 1552.

The uprising of 1553

After a brief stay in Santiago, Valdivia returned to the south again in December 1552. To keep the connection open between Concepción and the southern settlements, Valdivia had a number of forts built in Cordillera de Nahuelbuta. He moved against the Araucanians again in 1553 and built a fort at Tucapel. By the advice of the cacique Colocolo, the Araucanians united their efforts choosing as toqui (general-in-chief) the famous warrior Caupolicán.

Valdivia had earlier captured and presumably made friends with Lautaro, an Araucanian youth who became his groom. Lautaro secretly remained true to his own people and rejoined them to show Caupolicán a means by which Valdivia could be defeated. Toward the end of 1553, the Araucanians under Lautaro revolted and they fell on the over-extended Spanish forces in the south. One of the first signs that a big rebellion was building was the attack on the fort at Tucapel, where they managed to destroy the fortress on December 2, 1553. Valdivia was at Concepcion when he received notice of this event, and, believing that he could easily subdue the uprising, he hurried southward, sallying forth with only 40 men to stamp out the rebellion.

Near the ruins of the fortress Valdivia gathered the remnant of the garrison. He was ambushed before arriving to his destination and the Battle of Tucapel would be Valdivia's last. As each successive wave of attackers was wiped out or beaten off by the Spaniards, Lautaro sent another, until the entire Spanish company was massacred. The dreaded conquistador was captured still alive along with a priest by the Mapuche.

Death

There are many versions of how Valdivia's killing took place. According to Jerónimo de Vivar, an author contemporary with the events, the execution of Valdivia was personally ordered by Caupolicán, who had him killed with a lance, and later his head, and those of two of his bravest companions, were put on display. Alonso de Góngora Marmolejo, another contemporary chronicler, writes that Valdivia offered as a ransom for his life the evacuation of all the Spanish settlements in the Mapuche lands and the gift of large herds of animals, but this offer was rejected. The Mapuche first cut off his forearms and roasted and ate them in front of him before killing him and his accompanying priest.

Alonso de Ercilla reports that Valdivia was killed with the blow of a club, and then with a knife a warrior cut open his breast and ripped out his heart, which was then handed to the toqui, who sucked its blood; the heart was passed around from one to another. A drinking cup was made from Valdivia's skull. The warriors ran around the corpse, brandishing their lances and uttering cries, while the rest of the assembly stamped with their feet.

Another contemporary chronicler, Pedro Mariño de Lobera, wrote that Valdivia offered to evacuate the lands of the Mapuche but says he was shortly thereafter killed with a large club by a vengeful warrior named Pilmaiquen, who said that Valdivia could not be trusted to keep his word once freed. Lobera says that a common story in Chile at the time was that Valdivia had been killed by being forced to drink molten gold. According to an even later legend, Lautaro took Valdivia to the Mapuche camp and put him to death after three days of torture, extracting his beating heart and eating it with the Mapuche leaders. Probably all the stories about his death are apocryphal, since none of his party survived the battle, and the only known witnesses were indigenous fighters captured in subsequent battles.

In literature
Valdivia was an educated man and wielded the pen as well as the sword. In 1552 Valdivia despatched Captain Jerónimo de Alderete with a narrative of his exploits directly to the king Charles I. His twelve letters, addressed to the king and mostly preserved in the archives of the Indies, are models of a vigorous and fluent style, and of great historical interest.

His career and death are treated in the epic poem La Araucana by Alonso de Ercilla. He is also a major character in several historical novels, such as Inés y las raíces de la tierra, by María Correa Morande (1964); Ay Mamá Inés - Crónica Testimonial (1993) by Jorge Guzmán; Arauco: A Novel (2013), by John Caviglia; and Inés of My Soul by Isabel Allende (2006).

See also

Jerónimo de Alderete
Francisco de Villagra
Francisco de Aguirre
Inés de Suárez
Juan Jufré
Arauco War
Mapuche people
Lautaro
Caupolicán
Colocolo

References

Sources

External links
 

Explorers of Chile
Spanish conquistadors
Spanish explorers
Royal Governors of Chile
1497 births
1553 deaths
Spanish city founders
Extremaduran conquistadors
People from Villanueva de la Serena
People of the Arauco War
People of the Italian Wars
16th-century executions
Spanish people executed abroad
1540s in the Captaincy General of Chile
16th-century Chilean people
16th-century Spanish people
Characters in La Araucana
People killed in the Arauco War